Mikhail Alekseyevich Levashov (born 4 October 1991) is a Russian football player who plays as a goalkeeper for FC Arsenal Tula.

Club career
He made his professional debut in the Russian Professional Football League for FC Arsenal-2 Tula on 12 July 2014 in a game against FC Avangard Kursk.

He made his Russian Premier League debut for FC Arsenal Tula in a game against FC Tom Tomsk on 17 September 2016.

Career statistics

Club

References

External links
 
 

1991 births
Sportspeople from Tula Oblast
Living people
Russian footballers
Association football goalkeepers
FC Volga Nizhny Novgorod players
FC Khimik-Arsenal players
FC Arsenal Tula players
Russian Premier League players
Russian First League players
Russian Second League players